Aquaflex is a company in Southern California that was founded in 2000 as a research, development and manufacturer focusing on niche products to address failures in conventional solutions. Aquaflex specializes in construction brand of waterproof flooring installation and concrete repair products, centered around its patented waterproof adhesive technology.

References 

Manufacturing companies established in 2000
American companies established in 2000
2000 establishments in California